Steve Shepherd was a five-time world kickboxing champion and a top pioneer kickboxing promoter in the state of Florida. He defeated eight world champions from five weight divisions, four of them during their championship reigns. He also decisioned future world champions Don Wilson, Ted Pryor, Dale "Apollo" Cook and Bob "Thunder" Thurman.

Promoting events between 1977–1999, Shepherd was the first kickboxing world champion who was also a major event promoter. In the 1970s, he helped make South Florida a capital for the then new sport. Promoting principally out of West Palm Beach Auditorium, he was the first kickboxer to draw over $1 million in live gate receipts. He further proved that the sport could be financially viable through regular live events at the same venue.

Biography
Shepherd was born on October 10, 1950 in New York City, New York. He later moved to Lake Worth and West Palm Beach, Florida. Steve passed away on May 12th 2021 due to injuries sustained in an accident in November 2020. 

He studied karate with Mark Herman and Paul Anselmo, earning his black belt in Shotokan-Goju karate, before turning to the pro-kickboxing ring in early 1975.

Shepherd opened his own karate school in West Palm Beach and also began promoting kickboxing matches. He maintained both ventures throughout his world championship career. After retiring from the ring, he trained, managed and promoted over 200 state, golden gloves national and world champions; both amateur and professional. He also ran Shepherd's Boxing & Kickboxing Center for over 25 years which became a favorite South Florida training facility for a multitude of popular champions: Don "The Dragon" Wilson, Bill “Superfoot” Wallace, Oscar De La Hoya, Zab Judah, Michael Moorer, Kassim Ouma and others.

In 1979, he founded Ringstar Promotions for his live event business (1979-1999), Ringstar Products for his kickboxing equipment and, in 2009, ArmorFit for his mixed martial arts equipment business.

Fight career
Early on, Shepherd scored wins over Florida cult legends Gator Garland, Bill Clarke, Harold "Nature Boy" Roth (a.k.a. Harold Diamond), and Joe Marciano.

He first courted national attention in 1978 when he defeated Bob Ryan for the PKA version of the welterweight world championship (at 157 pounds). Six months later, in a bout broadcast over CBS-TV, he lost the title in a split decision to Earnest Hart, Jr. He rebounded in 1979, defeating Chris Gallegos for the WKA middleweight world title (at 160 pounds), and then became the first champion to unify the sport's two major crowns with a sixth-round knockout of Hart to regain the PKA welterweight world title. He was retroactively recognized as the undisputed STAR ratings world champion upon its founding in 1980.

In 1981, after double sanctioning his rubber match title defense against Hart, the PKA exercised its legal right to remove Shepherd as its champion owing to a dispute over broadcasting rights.  A few months later, Earnest Hart won Shepherd's involuntarily vacated title; Hart was the same contender Shepherd had just knocked out for a second time.

In November 1981, Shepherd challenged PKA heavyweight world champion Demetrius "Oaktree" Edwards in an effort to embarrass the sanctioning body for having stripped his title. On the eve of that bout, the PKA withdrew its sanction for a heavyweight title defense. Nevertheless, while only a middleweight, Shepherd outpointed heavyweight Edwards in a 10-round non-title match in West Palm Beach, Florida, a feat that made him the first middleweight kickboxer ever ranked number-one in the heavyweight division. He was also recognized as “Fighter of the Year” by Official Karate magazine's 1982 Kickboxing Hall of Fame.

Previously, in early 1981, Shepherd knocked out Albuquerque's John Moncayo in the first round. However, in 1982 an improperly dieted and badly dehydrated Shepherd lost his title in Las Vegas over nationally syndicated TV to that same John Moncayo. Moncayo TKOed Shepherd with an overhand right that broke Shepherd's jaw. Moncayo also prevailed in the rubber match when Shepherd again sustained a broken jaw.

One year later, in 1983, Shepherd moved up in weight to capture the WKA super middleweight world title from Japan's Yasuo Tabata in a close split decision. Shortly afterward, he was diagnosed with a ruptured disk in his neck that most probably occurred during his extraordinary battle against heavyweight champion Demetrius Edwards. The disk had pinched a nerve and shortened the reach of his right arm. He would never again possess the hefty punching power that had made him a champion. He announced his retirement from active kickboxing in 1987, though he made periodic return appearances until 1999, and has scheduled a fight for March 2019.

In a 1987 retirement interview, Shepherd told South Florida's Sun-Sentinel newspaper that his biggest fight purse was $45,000.00 and his smallest was $150.00.

Professional kickboxing record
Below is the documented professional ring record of Steve Shepherd from the S.T.A.R. ratings website. Shepherd fought 56 fights from February 1975 to June 1999. Of those fights, 50 were wins (27 knockouts), 5 were losses, and 1 was a no-contest. Shepherd dominated as a kickboxing World Champion in 10 bouts over 4 weight divisions for 4 sanctioning organizations. As a middleweight, he also defeated one heavyweight world champion in a non-title bout.

|-
|-  bgcolor="#CCFFCC"
| 1999-06-18 || Win ||align=left| Don Steadman || I.S.K.A. event at National Guard Armory || West Palm Beach, Florida, USA || Decision || 5 ||      || 50-5-1
|-
|-  bgcolor="#CCFFCC"
| 1998-11    || Win ||align=left| Tom Bentley || I.S.K.A. event at West Palm Beach Auditorium || West Palm Beach, Florida, USA || Decision || 6 ||      || 49-5-1
|-
|-  bgcolor="#FFBBBB"
| 1994-09-24 || Loss ||align=left| Francis Farley || I.S.K.A. event at West Palm Beach Auditorium || West Palm Beach, Florida, USA || TKO || 7 || bell || 48-5-1
|-
! style=background:white colspan=9 |
|-
|-  bgcolor="#CCFFCC"
| 1993-06-19 || Win ||align=left| Francisco Campeon || I.S.K.A. event at West Palm Beach Auditorium || West Palm Beach, Florida, USA || KO || 4 ||   || 48-4-1
|-
! style=background:white colspan=9 |
|-
|-  bgcolor="#CCFFCC"
| 1990-07-14 || Win ||align=left| Kevin Gruca || I.S.K.A. event at West Palm Beach Auditorium || West Palm Beach, Florida, USA || KO || 3 ||      || 47-4-1
|-
|-  bgcolor="#FFBBBB"
| 1988-07-30 || Loss ||align=left| Robert Harris || I.S.K.A. event at West Palm Beach Auditorium || West Palm Beach, Florida, USA || Disqualification || 7 || 2:00 || 46-4-1
|-
! style=background:white colspan=9 |
|-
|-  bgcolor="#CCFFCC"
| 1987-12-11 || Win ||align=left| Kevin Gruca || Independent event at West Palm Beach Auditorium || West Palm Beach, Florida, USA || Decision || 6 ||      || 46-3-1
|-
|-  bgcolor="#CCFFCC"
| 1987-10-21 || Win ||align=left| William Knorr || W.K.A. event at West Palm Beach Auditorium || West Palm Beach, Florida, USA || Decision || 5 ||      || 45-3-1
|-
|-  bgcolor="#CCFFCC"
| 1988-08-07 || Win ||align=left| Alan Watson || W.K.A. event at West Palm Beach Auditorium || West Palm Beach, Florida, USA || Decision || 5 ||      || 44-3-1
|-
|-  bgcolor="#c5d2ea"
| 1984-10-20 || NC ||align=left| Larry McFadden || W.K.A. event at Palm Beach Junior College Auditorium || West Palm Beach, Florida, USA || No Contest || 4 ||      || 43-3-1
|-
! style=background:white colspan=9 |
|-
|-  bgcolor="#CCFFCC"
| 1983-10-22 || Win ||align=left| Yasuo Tabata || W.K.A. event at West Palm Beach Auditorium || West Palm Beach, Florida, USA || Decision (Split) || 11 ||   || 41-3-0
|-
! style=background:white colspan=9 |
|-
|-  bgcolor="#CCFFCC"
| 1983-08-19 || Win ||align=left| Jerry Jenson || W.K.A. event at West Palm Beach Auditorium || West Palm Beach, Florida, USA || KO || 2 ||      || 42-3-0
|-
|-  bgcolor="#CCFFCC"
| 1983-07-08 || Win ||align=left| Joe Marciano || W.K.A. event at Diplomat Hotel || Hollywood-by-the-Sea, Florida, USA || KO || 2 ||      || 41-3-0
|-
|-  bgcolor="#FFBBBB"
| 1982-11-06 || Loss ||align=left| John Moncayo || W.K.C. event at West Palm Beach Auditorium || West Palm Beach, Florida, USA || Decision || 11 ||   || 40-3-0
|-
! style=background:white colspan=9 |
|-
|-  bgcolor="#FFBBBB"
| 1982-06-26 || Loss ||align=left| John Moncayo || W.K.A. event at Sands Hotel || Las Vegas, Nevada, USA || TKO || 9 ||   || 40-2-0
|-
! style=background:white colspan=9 |
|-
|-  bgcolor="#CCFFCC"
| 1982-02-20 || Win ||align=left| Daryl Croker || W.K.A. event at West Palm Beach Auditorium || West Palm Beach, Florida, USA || KO || 4 ||   || 40-1-0
|-
! style=background:white colspan=9 |
|-
|-  bgcolor="#CCFFCC"
| 1981-11-19 || Win ||align=left| Demetrius Edwards || W.K.A. event at West Palm Beach Auditorium || West Palm Beach, Florida, USA || Decision (Split) || 4 ||   || 39-1-0
|-
! style=background:white colspan=9 |
|-
|-  bgcolor="#CCFFCC"
| 1981-10-10 || Win ||align=left| Frank Knight || W.K.A. event at West Palm Beach Auditorium || West Palm Beach, Florida, USA || KO || 5 ||   || 38-1-0
|-
|-  bgcolor="#CCFFCC"
| 1981-07-25 || Win ||align=left| Dave Hedgecock || W.K.A. event at West Palm Beach Auditorium || West Palm Beach, Florida, USA || TKO || 3 ||   || 37-1-0
|-
! style=background:white colspan=9 |
|-
|-  bgcolor="#CCFFCC"
| 1981-05-02 || Win ||align=left| Bob Thurman || W.K.A. event at West Palm Beach Auditorium || West Palm Beach, Florida, USA || Decision || 8 ||   || 36-1-0
|-
|-  bgcolor="#CCFFCC"
| 1981-04-22 || Win ||align=left| Frank Medina || Independent event at West Palm Beach Auditorium || West Palm Beach, Florida, USA || Decision || 6 ||   || 35-1-0
|-
! style=background:white colspan=9 |
|-
|-  bgcolor="#CCFFCC"
| 1981-02-03 || Win ||align=left| John Moncayo || W.K.A. event at West Palm Beach Auditorium || West Palm Beach, Florida, USA || KO || 1 ||   || 34-1-0
|-
|-  bgcolor="#CCFFCC"
| 1981-01-19 || Win ||align=left| Greg Smith || W.K.A. event at Brassy's Nightclub || Cocoa Beach, Florida, USA || TKO || 6 ||   || 33-1-0
|-
|-  bgcolor="#CCFFCC"
| 1980-11-07 || Win ||align=left| Earnest Hart, Jr. || P.K.A. & W.K.A. event at West Palm Beach Auditorium || West Palm Beach, Florida, USA || KO || 7 ||   || 32-1-0
|-
! style=background:white colspan=9 |
|-
|-  bgcolor="#CCFFCC"
| 1980-Fall || Win ||align=left| Javier (surname unreported)|| Independent event || Miami, Florida, USA || TKO || 1 ||   || 31-1-0
|-
|-  bgcolor="#CCFFCC"
| 1980-Fall || Win ||align=left| Frank Williams || Independent event || Miami, Florida, USA || KO || 2 ||   || 30-1-0
|-
|-  bgcolor="#CCFFCC"
| 1980-Fall || Win ||align=left| Julio Rodriquez || Independent event || Miami, Florida, USA || TKO || 1 || 0:30 || 29-1-0
|-
! style=background:white colspan=9 |
|-
|-  bgcolor="#CCFFCC"
| 1980-07-26 || Win ||align=left| Arthur O’Laughlin || P.K.A. event at West Palm Beach Auditorium || West Palm Beach, Florida, USA || KO || 6 || 1:32 || 28-1-0
|-
! style=background:white colspan=9 |
|-
|-  bgcolor="#CCFFCC"
| 1980-05-17 || Win ||align=left| Mike Brennan || P.K.A. event at West Palm Beach Auditorium || West Palm Beach, Florida, USA || TKO || 12 ||   || 27-1-0
|-
! style=background:white colspan=9 |
|-
|-  bgcolor="#CCFFCC"
| 1980-02-08 || Win ||align=left| Gary Baker || P.K.A. event at West Palm Beach Auditorium || West Palm Beach, Florida, USA || TKO || 2 ||   || 26-1-0
|-
|-  bgcolor="#CCFFCC"
| 1979-10-19 || Win ||align=left| Earnest Hart, Jr. || P.K.A. event at West Palm Beach Auditorium || West Palm Beach, Florida, USA || KO || 6 || 1:58 || 25-1-0
|-
! style=background:white colspan=9 |
|-
|-  bgcolor="#CCFFCC"
| 1979-05-26 || Win ||align=left| Chris Gallegos || W.K.A. event at West Palm Beach Auditorium || West Palm Beach, Florida, USA || Decision || 9 ||   || 24-1-0
|-
! style=background:white colspan=9 |
|-
|-  bgcolor="#CCFFCC"
| 1979-03-07 || Win ||align=left| Dale Cook || Independent event at West Palm Beach Auditorium || West Palm Beach, Florida, USA || Decision || 9 ||   || 23-1-0
|-
|-  bgcolor="#CCFFCC"
| 1979-01-13 || Win ||align=left| Benny Fernandez || P.K.A. event || Bradenton, Florida, USA || KO || 2 ||   || 22-1-0
|-
|-  bgcolor="#FFBBBB"
| 1978-11-30 || Win ||align=left| Earnest Hart, Jr. || P.K.A. event || Atlanta, Georgia, USA || Decision || 12 ||   || 21-1-0
|-
! style=background:white colspan=9 |
|-
|-  bgcolor="#CCFFCC"
| 1978-10-20 || Win ||align=left| Pete Manchee || P.K.A. event at West Palm Beach Auditorium || West Palm Beach, Florida, USA || KO || 4 ||   || 21-0-0
|-
|-  bgcolor="#CCFFCC"
| 1978-07-22 || Win ||align=left| Bob Ryan || P.K.A. event at West Palm Beach Auditorium || West Palm Beach, Florida, USA || Decision || 9 ||   || 20-0-0
|-
! style=background:white colspan=9 |
|-
|-  bgcolor="#CCFFCC"
| 1978 || Win ||align=left| Jesse Brandt || Independent event || Stuart, Florida, USA || Decision || 5 ||      || 19-0-0
|-
|-  bgcolor="#CCFFCC"
| 1978-04-15 || Win ||align=left| Rick Herranz || P.K.A. event at Palm Beach Junior College Auditorium || West Palm Beach, Florida, USA || KO || 2 ||      || 18-0-0
|-
|-  bgcolor="#CCFFCC"
| 1977-12   || Win ||align=left| Bobby Sullivan || Independent event || Miami, Florida, USA || Decision || 7 ||      || 17-0-0
|-
|-  bgcolor="#CCFFCC"
| 1977-11-15 || Win ||align=left| Jesse Brandt || Independent event at West Palm Beach Auditorium || West Palm Beach, Florida, USA || KO || 1 ||      || 16-0-0
|-
|-  bgcolor="#CCFFCC"
| 1977   || Win ||align=left| Gator Garland || Independent event || Miami, Florida, USA || Decision || 6 ||      || 15-0-0
|-
|-  bgcolor="#CCFFCC"
| 1977-09-10 || Win ||align=left| Bill Knoblock || P.K.A. event || Miami, Florida, USA || Decision || 5 ||      || 14-0-0
|-
|-  bgcolor="#CCFFCC"
| 1977-07-16 || Win ||align=left| Ted Pryor || Independent event at West Palm Beach Auditorium || West Palm Beach, Florida, USA || Decision (Split) || 7 ||   || 13-0-0
|-
|-  bgcolor="#CCFFCC"
| 1977-05-07 || Win ||align=left| James Sisco || Independent event || Ft. Lauderdale, Florida, USA || KO || 5 ||      || 12-0-0
|-
|-  bgcolor="#CCFFCC"
| 1977-04 || Win ||align=left| Dennis Black || Independent event at Palm Beach Junior College Auditorium || West Palm Beach, Florida, USA || Decision || 5 ||      || 11-0-0
|-
|-  bgcolor="#CCFFCC"
| 1977-03 || Win ||align=left| Harold Roth (Harold Diamond) || Independent event at Mr. America Contest || Ft. Lauderdale, Florida, USA || KO || 2 ||      || 10-0-0
|-
|-  bgcolor="#CCFFCC"
| 1976 || Win ||align=left| Benny Fernandez || Independent event || Miami, Florida, USA || KO || 1 ||      || 9-0-0
|-
|-  bgcolor="#CCFFCC"
| 1976-09-11 || Win ||align=left| Bill Clarke || P.K.A. event || Tampa, Florida, USA || Decision || 7 ||      || 8-0-0
|-
! style=background:white colspan=9 |
|-
|-  bgcolor="#CCFFCC"
| 1976 || Win ||align=left| Julio Rodriguez || Independent event || Miami, Florida, USA || KO || 3 ||      || 7-0-0
|-
|-  bgcolor="#CCFFCC"
| 1976-08-14 || Win ||align=left| Napoleon Davis || P.K.A. event || Tampa, Florida, USA || KO || 3 ||      || 6-0-0
|-
|-  bgcolor="#CCFFCC"
| 1976-08-07 || Win ||align=left| Dave Dean || P.K.A. & S.E.P.K.C. event || Tampa, Florida, USA || Decision || 5 ||      || 5-0-0
|-
|-  bgcolor="#CCFFCC"
| 1976-07-31 || Win ||align=left| Rex Abernathy || P.K.A. event || Tampa, Florida, USA || Decision || 5 ||      || 4-0-0
|-
|-  bgcolor="#CCFFCC"
| 1976-05-28 || Win ||align=left| Gary Felder || P.K.A. event || Tampa, Florida, USA || Decision || 5 ||      || 3-0-0
|-
|-  bgcolor="#CCFFCC"
| 1975-11 || Win ||align=left| Don Wilson || Independent event || Miami, Florida, USA || Decision || 3 ||      || 2-0-0
|-
|-  bgcolor="#CCFFCC"
| 1975-02 || Win ||align=left| Harold Roth || Independent event || Tampa, Florida, USA || TKO || 3 ||      || 1-0-0
|-
|-
| colspan=9 | Legend:

Footnotes

1950 births
Living people
American male kickboxers
Kickboxers from Florida
Middleweight kickboxers